Si Kham is a tambon (subdistrict) of Mae Chan District, in Chiang Rai Province, Thailand. In 2015, it had a population of 6,118 people.

History
The subdistrict was created on 1 August 1984, when ten administrative villages were split off from Pa Sang Subdistrict. One village was split off when the subdistrict Mae Salong Nai was created in 1991.

Administration

Central administration
The tambon is divided into 11 administrative villages (mubans).

Local administration
The area of the subdistrict is covered by the subdistrict administrative organization (SAO) Si Kham (องค์การบริหารส่วนตำบลศรีค้ำ).

References

External links
Thaitambon.com on Si Kham

Tambon of Chiang Rai province
Populated places in Chiang Rai province